When the Love Is Gone is a 2013 Filipino romantic drama film directed by Andoy Ranay and starring Cristine Reyes, Gabby Concepcion, Alice Dixson, Andi Eigenmann, and Jake Cuenca. The film is distributed by Viva Films with co-production of MVP Pictures and was released November 27, 2013, nationwide as part of Viva Films' 32nd anniversary.

The film is a remake of the 1983 blockbuster film Nagalit ang Buwan sa Haba ng Gabi by Danny Zialcita which stars Laurice Guillen, Gloria Diaz, Dindo Fernando, Janice de Belen, and Eddie Garcia.

Cast

Main cast 

Cristine Reyes as Cassandra "Cassie" Manuel
Gabby Concepcion as Emmanuel "Emman" Luis
Alice Dixson as Audrey Luis
Andi Eigenmann as Jenny Luis
Jake Cuenca as Yuri

Supporting cast 
Dina Bonnevie as Zelda Kagaoan-Luis
Pilar Pilapil as Cynthia Manuel
Anton Revilla as Gabe Kagaoan

Special participation 
Hideo Muraoka as Paolo
Lander Vera Perez as Noel
DJ Durano as Miko
Shy Carlos as Chloe
Jaime Fabregas as Yuri's Father
Ana Abad Santos as Grace
Thou Reyes as Petra

Cameo appearance 
Nadine Lustre as Jenny's friend

Awards and nominations

International screening 
Starting December 6, 2013, When the Love Is Gone will be shown in selected theaters in Los Angeles, San Francisco, San Diego, Las Vegas, Virginia, Texas, Arizona, Nevada, Washington and Hawaii.

Reception

Critical response 
Bernie Franco of PEP.ph gave the film a positive review, stating "When The Love Is Gone can hardly be accused of simply riding on the bandwagon because it is a remake of the 1983 Filipino movie "Nagalit ang Buwan sa Haba ng Gabi". He also stated that "the twists in the story are definitely something to watch for and these separate When The Love is Gone from other drama movies also tackling the same theme" and "is worth watching despite the proliferation of movies about extramarital affairs nowadays." He also praised the cast's performance and the film's script.

Pablo Tariman of The Philippine Star also gave the film a positive review, stating that "When the Love Is Gone is another polished variation of a beautiful love story sensually told with wit and finesse." He also praised Ranay's astounding performance as a director.

However, Phylber Ortiz Dy gave a negative review gave the film 1 out of 5 stars, stating that When the Love Is Gone "is all just nonsense. The relationships don't make any sense, and the people do not act like real human beings." He also stated that "When the Love is Gone only gets worse in its endgame. There it disregards whatever trauma the characters went through to provide a shade of a happy ending [...] Nothing really happened. The whole thing was just an exercise in creating scenes where women yell at each other and generally behave badly. It is toxic and hateful and generally just terrible."

See also 
 Nagalit ang Buwan sa Haba ng Gabi

References

External links 

When the Love Is Gone at VIVA Films

2013 films
2013 romantic drama films
2010s Tagalog-language films
Remakes of Philippine films
Philippine romantic drama films
2010s English-language films
Films directed by Andoy Ranay